The  or the Straits of Shimonoseki is the stretch of water separating Honshu and Kyushu, two of Japan's four main islands. On the Honshu side of the strait is Shimonoseki (which contributed "Kan" to the name of the strait) and on the Kyushu side is Kitakyushu, whose former city and present ward, Moji, gave the strait its "mon". The straits silt up at the rate of about 15 centimetres per annum, and dredging has made it possible to build the Kitakyushu Airport at low cost.

Western maps from the 19th century also refer to this waterway as the Straits of Van der Capellen.

Population of Kanmon area

The total population of the Kanmon area is about 1.3 million, counting the whole of Kitakyushu (approx. one million) and Shimonoseki (approx. 300,000), although detailed definitions vary widely (see Fukuoka–Kitakyushu).

Tourism
Fireworks festival
The Kanmon Straits Summer Fireworks Festival is held in August every year.
Boat rides
The Voyager pleasure boat departs from Moji-kō and cruises the straits.
Helicopter and airship flights
Helicopter joyrides are available from Kaikyo Dramaship in Moji-kō.
In October 2005, one of the world's largest airships currently flying (a Zeppelin NT imported from Germany) also passed through Moji on an all-Japan tour. This airship was purchased by Nippon Airship Corporation in June 2004 and was used in the Tokyo area and at the Aichi Expo 2005.

Transportation across the Straits

The Kanmon Straits can be crossed in a number of ways, the oldest of which are the ferries. There is a car ferry between Nishiminato (Kokura) and Hikinoshima (Shimonoseki) which takes about ten minutes, and a passenger ferry from Moji-ko to Shimonoseki (Karato wharf). There is also a bridge which carries an expressway. By far the most used method is a number of Kanmon Tunnels which carry the Sanyō Shinkansen, trains, cars, and even one for pedestrians at the narrowest point.

The first railway tunnel was opened on November 15, 1942. The highway tunnel was opened on March 9, 1958. The Kanmonkyo Bridge (see photo) was opened to vehicles on November 14, 1973. The Shinkansen tunnel was opened on March 10, 1975.

Commercial importance
The Kanmon straits is also the connection between the Sea of Japan and the Inland Sea. It is used by many cargo ships as a shortcut to Osaka and Tokyo from Korea and China. The New Kitakyushu Airport is also nearby.

Historical significance
 Battle of Dan-no-ura
 Battle of Shimonoseki Straits
 Bombardment of Shimonoseki
 Treaty of Shimonoseki

Transportation 
The New Kitakyushu Airport opened in Kitakyushu on March 16, 2006, and is expected to bring further prosperity in the form of increased tourism and trade to the area.

Ferries from Shimonoseki Port International Terminal:
The Kanpu ferry to Busan in South Korea
The Orient ferry to Qingdao in China
The Orient ferry to Shanghai in China

See also
 Geological formation of the Japanese Islands
 Mekari Shrine

References

External links

 Kanmon straits guide 

Straits of Japan
Straits of Asia
Landforms of Fukuoka Prefecture
Landforms of Yamaguchi Prefecture